Graduate School of Business Administration, also known as Lomonosov Moscow State University Business School, founded in 1989 in Moscow State University is one GSBA Business School Moscow of the oldest business schools in Russia.
Graduate School of Business Administration offers Bachelor of Management, Master in International Business, MBA, Executive MBA Programmes and Doctoral Programme (PhD).
Lomonosov MSU BS also offers corporate programmes.  Lomonosov MSU BS was ranked #1 in Russia according to the surveys held by the business magazine "Secret Firmy" in 2007, 2008 and 2010.

Faculty history

The Graduate School of Business has started its history in 1989, when one of the first business schools in Russia was opened at the Moscow State University - the School of Management of Moscow State University. In 1995, the MSUBS has opened one of the first programs in Russia "Master of Business Administration (MBA)". In 2001, the MSUBS was assigned to a separate structural unit of the Moscow University in accordance with the decision of the Academic Council of the Moscow State University. In the same year, the construction of the building of the Higher School of Business of Moscow State University, which was sponsored to the Moscow University by the Japanese organisation, was completed. In 2015, a new master program was launched to train IT professionals in the field of management. In 2016, existing program of international business and strategy has opened its doors for the new students from abroad.

Education program
Students are trained in the field of management.

Bachelor’s degree
The "Bachelor" program of the Higher School of Business of Moscow State University is a 4-year program of management education for graduates of secondary and special educational institutions. Classes are held during the day, the form of studying is full-time. Upon graduation, the graduates receive a State Diploma of Higher education with a Bachelor of Management degree. The Bachelor program includes a number of compulsory courses and elective courses, including such disciplines as: accounting, innovative management, marketing, international business, organizational behavior, management fundamentals, strategic management, HR management, financial management, organization theory, corporate social responsibility of business, etc.
All training has a practical focus. All students pass compulsory practice in companies. Beginning with the 3rd year, students study up to 70% of the subjects in English.

Master's degree
The "Master" program is a two-year program of the second stage of higher education. The program is designed for graduates of universities with a bachelor's degree or a diploma of a specialist aimed at building a career or developing their own business.
The MSc MSU has two areas of training: "International Business and Strategy" and.
The program "International Business and Strategy" is a program whose content meets the requirements of the professional standard "Information Technology Manager" (approved by the order of the Ministry of Labor of Russia No. 915 of October 13, 2014).

MBA
The program is constructed in the form of thematic modules, within which the training courses are replaced by master classes, discussions, group discussions and company visits. The emphasis is on practical exercises that allow developing skills in analyzing real business situations, searching for and making managerial decisions. The format of the program requires students to be highly involved in the learning process, not only during the training modules, but also between them (preparing for modules and performing tasks on the topics discussed on the module).

References

Business schools in Russia
Geography, Faculty of
Education in Moscow